Tororo Cement Limited (TCL), a Ugandan company, is one of the largest manufacturers of construction materials in East Africa.

Location
The coordinates of the main factory are 0°39'36.0"N, 34°09'18.0"E (Latitude:0.6600; Longitude:34.1550).

Overview
TCL is the largest manufacturer of cement in Uganda, producing an estimated 3.0 million metric tonnes annually. In second place is Hima Cement Limited, which produces an estimated 1.7 million metric tonnes annually. In July 2015, TCL successfully completed and commissioned  a UGX:86 billion expansion to increase annual production to 3.0 million metric tonnes. Production on the newly completed production line is expected to begin in March 2018.

History
TCL was established in 1952 by the British colonial government to manufacture cement from the abundantly available limestone in the area around the town of Tororo in the Eastern Region. The company, then known as Uganda Cement Industries (UCI), was administered as a parastatal company under the umbrella of the Uganda Development Corporation. In 1995, the government of Uganda divested from UCI, which was then acquired by the present owners and re-branded as Tororo Cement Limited.

Subsidiary company
Mombasa Cement Limited in Mombasa, Kenya is a subsidiary of Tororo Cement Limited.

Ownership
The shares of stock of TCL are privately held. The detailed shareholding in the company is not publicly disclosed.

See also
 Busia, Uganda

References

External links
 Website of Tororo Cement Limited
  Company Profile At Linkedin

Manufacturing companies established in 1952
1952 establishments in Uganda
Tororo District
Eastern Region, Uganda
Cement companies of Uganda